The Alliston Hornets are a Canadian Junior ice hockey team based in Alliston, Ontario, Canada.  Starting with the 2016-17 hockey season the Hornets will be members of the Provincial Junior Hockey League. Prior to the change they played in the Georgian Mid-Ontario Junior C Hockey League.

History
The Alliston Hornets were founded in 1971 as a member of the South-Central Junior D Hockey League.  In 1973, that league was promoted and renamed the Central Ontario Junior C Hockey League and then the Mid-Ontario Junior C Hockey League in 1976.

Despite training multiple National Hockey League alumni, the Hornets were in tough in the Mid-Ontario Junior C Hockey League with teams like the Bradford Bulls and the Orangeville Crushers.  The Hornets won the Mid-Ontario Junior C Hockey League crown 6 times, but never got past the Clarence Schmalz Cup semi-final in the All-Ontario championships.

In 1994, the Mid-Ontario Junior C Hockey League merged with the Georgian Bay Junior C Hockey League to create the Georgian Mid-Ontario Junior C Hockey League.  From 1994 until 2007, the Hornets have failed to win a league title.  Other than a blip in the radar in 2001-02 that resulted in a 2nd place league finish but no playoff glory, since 1994 the Hornets were not up to par with their competition.  In 2004, something changed.  Since 2004, the Hornets have been putting up excellent winning seasons with a first-place finish and two third-place finishes.

The 2005–06 season saw the Hornets finish off in third place.  In the league quarter-final they drew the sixth seeded Stayner Siskins.  In what many though would be a cakewalk, the Siskins had another shocking conclusion in mind.  The Hornets went up on the Siskins 3-games-to-none with little problem.  Game 4 saw the Siskins avoid the sweep with a win.  The Siskins had gained enough momentum to take game 5 as well.  Eventually, in the end, the Siskins won four straight games to make the ultimate comeback and take the series 4-games-to-3 over the Alliston Hornets.

The 2006–07 season saw the Hornets leading the standing for the first half of the season and then fall away to both the Fergus Devils and Penetang Kings.  Finishing with the third seed, the Hornets battled the Schomberg Cougars and made quick work of them with a 4-games-to-none sweep of the series.  In the semi-final, the Hornets drew the Goliath Clarence Schmalz Cup (CSC) defending Champion Penetang Kings.  The second seeded Kings won the series 4-games-to-2 in a drawn out seesaw battle.  The Kings went on to win their second straight league and provincial title.

Glory years (2007–present)
Since the beginning of the 2007–08 season, the Alliston Hornets finished the Penetang Kings successful run of two straight GMOHL titles and 2 Clarence Schmalz Cups with six consecutive GMOHL titles and two Schmalz Cups of their own.  In six regular seasons (2007-08 to the end of 2012–13), the Hornets have amassed a record of 213 wins, 23 losses, 3 ties, and 7 losses in overtime to win five GMOHL regular season banners.  In each of these six years, the Hornets have managed to win the GMOHL playoff championship and advance into the Ontario Hockey Association playdowns.

Success versus Walkerton
The OHA has pinned up the winner of the GMOHL against the Champion of the Western Ontario Junior C Hockey League every year in the provincial quarter-final since the GMOHL was formed in 1994.  From the 1995 playoffs until 2004, the Western League champion never failed in defeating the GMOHL champion.  In their twelfth year of competition, the Penetang Kings snapped that steak against the Kincardine Bulldogs and did it again in 2007 against the same team.  In the Western League, a new power was rising - the Walkerton Hawks, for years a basement dweller, had surged in recent years and took over the reins from the Bulldogs and like the Hornets won the Western League for six consecutive years.  The Hawks and Hornets would meet in the quarter-final of the OHA in each of those six years and it would prove to be a disaster for the Hawks.  Despite fielding competitive teams, the Hornets would win every series against the Hawks with a combined record of 24 wins and 9 losses.

Success versus the Empire B League
The OHA chooses semi-final opponents based on closest proximity to each other.  From 2008 until 2013, the Empire B Junior C Hockey League's champion has defeated the Central Ontario Junior C Hockey League's champion and has been inline to face the Hornets.  From 2008 until 2012 the Hornets did not lose a series to the Empire B League champion.  In 2008, the Hornets defeated the Napanee Raiders in 5 games, in 2009 the Amherstview Jets in 5 games, in 2010 the Raiders in 6 games, in 2011 the Picton Pirates in 4 games, and in 2012 the Hornets came back from a 3-games-to-none deficit to defeat the Campbellford Rebels in 7 games.  In five years, the Hornets recorded a record of 20 wins and 7 losses against the champions of the Empire B League.

In 2013, the tides changed, as the Picton Pirates returned to the Schmalz Cup semi-final.  The Pirates would sweep the Hornets in 4-straight-games to end Alliston's reign of dominance over the Empire B League.

Two provincial titles

Season-by-season standings

2000-2004
2004–Present

Clarence Schmalz Cup appearances
2008: Alliston Hornets defeated Essex 73's 4-games-to-3
2009: Essex 73's defeated Alliston Hornets 4-games-to-none
2010: Alliston Hornets defeated Belle River Canadiens 4-games-to-2
2011: Grimsby Peach Kings defeated Alliston Hornets 4-games-to-1
2012: Grimsby Peach Kings defeated Alliston Hornets 4-games-to-1

Notable alumni
Perry Anderson
Manny Legace
John Madden
Darrin Shannon
Darryl Shannon

References

External links
Hornets' OHA Webpage

Georgian Mid-Ontario Junior C Hockey League teams
1971 establishments in Ontario
Ice hockey clubs established in 1971